The 1992 Missouri gubernatorial election was held on November 3, 1992 and resulted in a victory for the Democratic nominee, Lt. Governor Mel Carnahan, over the Republican candidate, Missouri Attorney General William L. Webster, and Libertarian Joan Dow. Carnahan had defeated St. Louis mayor Vincent C. Schoemehl for the Democratic nomination, while Webster had defeated Secretary of State Roy Blunt and Treasurer Wendell Bailey for the Republican nomination.

Results
Despite the fact that Webster had wide recognition serving as the Attorney General of Missouri, he was handily defeated in a 17% margin of victory for Carnahan. Carnahan won the typically Democratic strongholds such as St. Louis and Kansas City, but also performed surprisingly well in most of rural Missouri. Carnahan's victory was likely aided in Bill Clinton's concurrent win in Missouri in the  1992 presidential election. Webster conceded defeat soon after the polls closed. This was a Democratic flip in the 1992 election cycle.

Coincidentally, Carnahan would eventually defeat Ashcroft in the 2000 Senate election, but Carnahan would later be killed in the plane crash while he was campaigning for the Senate.

References

Gubernatorial
1992
Missouri